In philately, a lettercard or letter card is a postal stationery item consisting of a folded card with a prepaid imprinted stamp. That it is folded over gives the writer twice as much room for the message compared with a postal card. The message is written on the inside and the card is then folded and sealed around the edges. The recipient tears off and discards the perforated selvages to open the card.

The lettercard was first conceived by a Hungarian named Akin Karoly and introduced in Belgium in 1882. Private issues were used in Great Britain in 1887. The first official British letter card was issued in 1892. In Newfoundland reply lettercards were introduced in 1912 which included a small reply card.

Letter cards were issued in a variety of card stock and colour. As with adhesive stamps, a perforation gauge will be a useful tool of the trade.

The terms Letter Card or Air Mail Letter Card were sometimes used on aerogrammes prior to 1952, the year that the U.P.U. gave official recognition of the word aerogramme.  But for aerograms, those terms are misleading.  The use of the word "card" implies a heavier card stock when, in fact, many of these "cards" were printed on light paper and were letter sheets instead of letter cards.

See also 
 Letter sheet
 Aerogram
 Postcard

References

External links 

Philatelic terminology
Postal stationery